Sodium peroxycarbonate or Sodium percarbonate, Sodium permonocarbonate is a chemical compound, a peroxycarbonate of sodium,  with formula

See also
Sodium percarbonate
Peroxycarbonate

References

Sodium compounds
Peroxides
Oxidizing agents